Vadiakkadu is a village in the Pattukkottai taluk of Thanjavur district, Tamil Nadu, India.

Demographics 

As per the 2001 census, Vadiakkadu had a total population of 591 with 278 males and 313 females. The sex ratio was 1126. The literacy rate was 67.64.

References 

 

Villages in Thanjavur district